Forssan Jalkapalloklubi (abbreviated FJK) is a football club from Forssa, Finland. The club was formed in 1997 and their home ground is at the Lamminrannan urheilukenttä.   The men's first team currently plays in the Kolmonen (Third Division).

Background 

FJK was established in 1997 following the merger of the Forssan A-futis and Pallotiimi Forssa clubs. There was a lot of preparation in getting to this stage since the concept was first mooted in October 1994.  The founding meeting was held on 30 January 1997 and was attended by Pertti Aalto, Ismo Suontausta, Tarmo Laajalehto, Ari Turtola, Tapio Virtanen, Kari Perkiö, Veikko Haavisto, Pauli Miettinen, Jari Rosenberg, Heikki Jokikunnas and Harri Hemming.

Following their early years in the Kolmonen (Third Division), the club have spent four seasons in the third tier of Finnish football, the Kakkonen (Second Division) in 2002–04 and 2008.

The last decade has been a rollercoaster with the highlight being the 2004 season when the club finished top of the West Group of the Kakkonen (Second Division) only to fail in the play-offs in gaining promotion to the Ykkönen (First Division).

The club over-stretched themselves and withdrew from the Kakkonen for 2005 before starting again in the Nelonen (Fourth Division) in 2006.  With back to back promotions FJK achieved their former status in the Kakkonen for 2008.  This time they were less successful in the third tier and quickly slipped back into the Kolmonen (Third Division) where the club currently reside.

Season to season

Club Structure

Forssan Jalkapalloklubi run a number of teams including 2 men's teams, 1 ladies team, 2 men's veterans teams (Pampa Boys), 8 boys teams and 4 girls teams.  In total the club has a total of more than 500 registered players and serves the Forssa, Tammela, Jokioinen, and Humppila and Ypäjä areas.

2010 season 

FJK Men's Team are competing in the Kolmonen (Third Division) section administered by the Tampere SPL.  This is the fourth highest tier in the Finnish football system.

FJK /2 participated in Section 1 of the Vitonen (Fifth Division) administered by the Tampere SPL in the 2009 season.  They have not entered a side for the 2010 campaign following relegation.

References

External links 
 Official Website
 Finnish Wikipedia
 Suomen Cup

Football clubs in Finland
Forssa
1997 establishments in Finland